Bertil "Bo" Bothén (14 July 1892 – 23 March 1966) was a Swedish sailor who competed in the 1912 Summer Olympics. In 1912, he was a crew member of the Swedish boat Marga which finished fourth in the 10 metre class competition.

Bothén was born in Gothenburg, Sweden 14 July 1892 and is brother to Björn Bothén, a fellow Marga crew member. Bo Bothén died on 23 March 1966 in Gothenburg at the age of 73.

References

1892 births
1966 deaths
Swedish male sailors (sport)
Olympic sailors of Sweden
Sailors at the 1912 Summer Olympics – 10 Metre
Sportspeople from Gothenburg